Luka Jagačić (born 26 October 1990) is a Croatian retired football midfielder who currently is the assistant coach at Icelandic team Reynir.

Club career 
Jagačić started his career playing at youth level for Varteks. He made his debut for the first team against Cibalia on 1 March 2009 in the Croatian top-level 1.HNL as a second-half substitute. The club lost its main sponsor, Varteks clothing factory, in 2010, and changed its 52-year-old name to NK Varaždin. Jagačić was loaned to Pomorac Kostrena in 2011, returned to play with the renamed NK Varaždin, then went on to play with HNK Gorica and Selfoss.

Jagačić returned to the hometown of Varaždin in 2016; the original NK Varaždin had folded in 2015, and he signed with a different, unassociated NK Varaždin.

In 2019, he joined Reynir but he never played a league game because of injury.

International career
Internationally, Luka Jagačić earned 15 Croatia national under-15/16/18/19 football team caps in 2005-2008.

References

External links
 

1990 births
Living people
Sportspeople from Varaždin
Association football midfielders
Croatian footballers
Croatia youth international footballers
NK Varaždin players
NK Pomorac 1921 players
HNK Gorica players
Selfoss men's football players
NK Varaždin (2012) players
Njarðvík FC players
Reynir Sandgerði men's football players
Croatian Football League players
1. deild karla players
2. deild karla players
Croatian expatriate footballers
Expatriate footballers in Iceland
Croatian expatriate sportspeople in Iceland